The name Ken has been used for four tropical cyclones in the western North Pacific Ocean and three in the Southern Hemisphere.

In the western North Pacific:
Tropical Storm Ken (1979) (T7912, 15W) – struck Japan.
Typhoon Ken (1982) (T8219, 20W, Tering) – struck Japan.
Typhoon Ken (1986) (T8602, 02W)
Tropical Storm Ken-Lola (1989) (T8912, 13W14W) – one storm with two names, operationally thought to have been separate due to difficulties in tracking poorly organized systems; hit eastern China.

In the Southern Hemisphere:
Cyclone Ken (1983)
Cyclone Ken (1992)
Cyclone Ken (2009)

Pacific typhoon set index articles
Australian region cyclone set index articles